Erldunda is a homestead at the road junction of the Stuart Highway and Lasseter Highways,  south-west of Alice Springs in the Northern Territory, Australia.  The locality is also referred to as Ghan.

Erldunda Station is a pastoral lease that operates as a cattle station. It occupies an area of  that carried a herd of 6,500 head of Santa Gertrudis cattle in 2010.

The property was established in the 1870s by Richard Warburton who stocked it in 1884, and the property remained with the Warburton family until the 1920s.

The station shares boundaries with other pastoral leases, such as Lyndavale to the west, Mount Ebenezer and Palmer Valley to the north, Idracowra to the east, and Umbeara and Victory Downs to the south. The ephemeral watercourses Karinga Creek and Kalamurta Creek both flow through the property.

References

External links 
 Erldunda Station Page on TripAdvisor.com
 Erldunda Wikivoyage page

Pastoral leases in the Northern Territory